The 2010–11 Slovak Extraliga season was the 18th season of the Slovak Extraliga since its creation after the breakup of Czechoslovakia and the Czechoslovak First Ice Hockey League in 1993.

Regular season

Standings

Key - GP: Games played, W: Wins, OTW/SOW: Overtime/Shootout wins, OTL/SOL: Overtime/Shootout losses, L: Losses, GF: Goals for, GA: Goals against, PTS: Points.

Statistics

Scoring leaders 
 
GP = Games played; G = Goals; A = Assists; Pts = Points; +/– = Plus/minus; PIM = Penalty minutes

Leading goaltenders 
These are the leaders in GAA among goaltenders that have played at least 1200 minutes.

GP = Games played; TOI = Time on ice (minutes); GA = Goals against; Sv% = Save percentage; GAA = Goals against average

Playoffs

Playoff bracket

Quarterfinals
 Košice – Nitra 4–1 (4–3, 6–0, 3–2PS, 1–3, 5–0)
 Poprad – Skalica 4–2 (0–2, 2–1, 2–1, 0–1OT, 6–3, 1–0)
 Banská Bystrica – Zvolen 4–3 (3–5, 3–4, 3–0, 4–3PS, 1–2PS, 3–2PS, 2–1)
 Slovan – Trenčín 3–4 (4–2, 4–1, 6–3, 2–3PS, 1–2, 3–6, 2–5)

Semifinals
 Košice – Trenčín 4–0 (9–1, 5–0, 4–3PS, 5–1)
 Poprad – Banská Bystrica 4–3 (7–5, 1–3, 1–3, 3–2, 4–3OT, 1–2PS, 6–4)

Finals
 Košice – Poprad 4–1 (3–1, 3–0, 1–2OT, 6–1, 4–1)

Relegation round
 Žilina – Piešťany 4–0 (4–2, 4–2, 3–1, 3–1)

Playoff statistics

Playoff scoring leaders

2010–11 All Star Team

Final rankings

References

External links
 , including schedules and statistics

2010-11
Slovak
Slovak